Amal Das (born 1 February 1958) is a former Indian cricketer. He played 45 first-class matches for Assam. Das was a right-handed batsman and a right-arm offbreak bowler. In May 2019, Das became the chairman of the senior selection committee of the Assam Cricket Association.

References

External links
 

1958 births
Living people
Indian cricketers
Assam cricketers
Cricketers from Guwahati
Cricketers from Assam